Ariel Alberto Salinas Salinas (born 9 March 1989) is Chilean footballer that currently plays for Chilean Second Division club Independiente de Cauquenes.

Club career
Salinas came up through Colo-Colo's youth ranks and made his debut for the club on May 5, 2007, against Cobreloa. After making only 5 league appearances for Colo-Colo he joined Unión San Felipe in 2008.

Honours

Club
Colo-Colo
 Primera División de Chile (2): 2007 Apertura, 2007 Clausura

 Unión San Felipe
 Primera B de Chile (2): 2009 Apertura, 2009 Clausura
 Copa Chile (1): 2009

External links

1989 births
Living people
People from San Felipe, Chile
Chilean footballers
Colo-Colo footballers
Unión San Felipe footballers
Trasandino footballers
A.C. Barnechea footballers
Municipal La Pintana footballers
Deportes Vallenar footballers
Deportes Recoleta footballers
Independiente de Cauquenes footballers
Chilean Primera División players
Primera B de Chile players
Segunda División Profesional de Chile players
Association football midfielders